Usermontu may refer to:

Usermontu (vizier), an ancient Egyptian of the late 18th Dynasty
Usermontu (mummy), a mummified dignitary, mainly known for having a prosthetic pin in his leg
Usermontu, a First Prophet of Montu during the Ramesside period, buried in Theban tomb TT382

Theophoric names
Ancient Egyptian given names